Hodalen Church is a parish church of the Church of Norway in Tolga Municipality in Innlandet county, Norway. It is located in the village of Hodalen. It is the church for the Hodalen parish which is part of the Nord-Østerdal prosti (deanery) in the Diocese of Hamar. The brown, wooden church was built in a long church design in 1934 using plans drawn up by the architect Andreas Sandmæl. The church seats about 120 people.

History
In 1899, the village of Hodalen got permission to build a cemetery so that people of the southern valley of Tolga had a place to bury their dead without the long trip to Tolga Church. During the 1920s, money was raised to build a chapel at the cemetery. Andreas Sandmæl was hired to design the new wooden chapel. It was completed and consecrated in 1934. Originally it was an annex chapel to the main Tolga Church, but later it was upgraded to be a parish church.

Media gallery

See also
List of churches in Hamar

References

Tolga, Norway
Churches in Innlandet
Long churches in Norway
Wooden churches in Norway
20th-century Church of Norway church buildings
Churches completed in 1934
1934 establishments in Norway